Agnes of France, renamed Anna (1171 – 1220), was Byzantine Empress by marriage to Alexios II Komnenos and Andronikos I Komnenos. She was a daughter of Louis VII of France and Adèle of Champagne.

Betrothal and marriage 
In early 1178, Philip, Count of Flanders visited Constantinople on his way back from the Holy Land. The Eastern Roman Emperor Manuel I Komnenos, who had already entertained Louis VII in Constantinople at Christmas 1147 during the Second Crusade, was perhaps finally convinced by Philip that France would be a desirable ally in Western Europe. Over the winter of 1178-1179 an Imperial embassy accompanying Philip, and led by the Genoese Baldovino Guercio, was sent to the French court to secure a match between Agnes and Alexios, the only son and heir apparent of Manuel by his second wife Maria of Antioch. This or some similar marriage alliance had been favored by Pope Alexander III as early as 1171.

It was not uncommon for princesses, when a future marriage had been agreed, to be brought up in their intended husband's family; this, indeed, is why Agnes probably never met her elder sister Alys, who lived in the Kingdom of England from the age of about nine, when her marriage to the future Richard I of England was agreed on (though this marriage never took place). Agnes took ship in Montpellier, bound for Constantinople, at Easter 1179. At Genoa the flotilla increased from 5 to 19 ships, captained by Baldovino Guercio.

On arrival in Constantinople in late summer 1179 Agnes was met by seventy high-ranking ladies and lavish festivities were organized for her. She was greeted with an oration from Eustathios, former Master of the Rhetors and archbishop of Thessalonica. She was perhaps now presented with an elaborate volume of welcoming verses by an anonymous author, sometimes called the Eisiterion.

According to William of Tyre, Agnes was eight on her arrival at Constantinople, while Alexios was thirteen. William got Alexios' age wrong (he was born on 14 September 1169) and there is no other source for Agnes' year of birth. If she was in fact eight, she was at least three years too young for marriage, according to most 12th-century views. However, William of Tyre, who was present at the ceremony, seems to describe it as a full wedding (matrimonii legibus ... copulare); in this he is followed by some other non-Byzantine sources and by many modern authors.

The ceremony took place in the Trullo Hall, in the Great Palace, on 2 March 1180. Agnes was officially renamed Anna. Eustathios of Thessalonica produced a speech to celebrate the occasion, whose title in the manuscript is Oration on the Public Celebrations of the Betrothal of the Two Royal Children. This ceremony came approximately one month after the wedding of Alexios' half-sister Maria Porphyrogenita to Renier of Montferrat, conducted by the Patriarch of Constantinople, Theodosios.

Empress
On 24 September 1180, Manuel died and Alexios succeeded him as Emperor. He was too young to rule unaided; his mother, Maria of Antioch, exercised more influence in affairs of state than Alexios or Anna.

In 1183 Maria of Antioch was displaced by a new power behind the throne, Andronikos I Komnenos. Andronikos was a first cousin of Manuel and was known to have harbored imperial ambitions for himself. He is believed to have arranged the deaths by poisoning of Maria Porphyrogenita and her husband Renier; he certainly imprisoned, and soon afterwards executed, Maria of Antioch. Andronikos was crowned co-ruler with Alexios; then, in October of the same year, he had Alexios strangled. Anna was now 12, and the approximately 65-year-old Andronikos married her.

Andronikos had previously been married (his first wife's name is unknown). He had had sexual relationships with two nieces (Eudokia Komnene and Theodora Komnene) and with Philippa of Antioch. Philippa was a daughter of Constance of Antioch and her first husband and consort Raymond of Poitiers; she was also a sister of Maria of Antioch and thus maternal aunt of Alexios. Andronikos had two sons by his first wife; he also had a young son and daughter from his affair with Theodora. His eldest son, Manuel already had a son of his own, the future Alexios I of Trebizond.

Anna was Empress consort for two years, until the deposition of Andronikos in September 1185. In an attempt to escape the popular uprising that ended his rule, Andronikos fled from Constantinople with Anna and his mistress (known only as Maraptike). They reached Chele, a fortress on the Bithynian coast of the Black Sea, where they tried to take ship for the Crimea. Their ship was prevented from sailing by contrary winds. Andronikos was eventually captured and returned to the capital, where he was tortured and killed on 12 September 1185.

Later life 
Anna survived Andronikos' fall and is next heard of in 1193, when she is said by a Western chronicler to have become the lover of Theodore Branas, a military leader who fought on the Empire's northern frontier. They did not at first marry.

After the fall of Constantinople in 1204, Agnes derived respect from the Latin barons due to her being a former empress. According to Robert of Clari, Agnes had a bad reputation and could only talk through a translator because she did not know French. At that time she was 30 years old and had spent most of her life in the Byzantine court.

Anna and Theodore eventually married, at the urging of the Latin emperor Baldwin I of Constantinople, in summer 1204. Theodore Branas continued to fight for the Latin Empire, and is last heard of in 1219, by which time Agnes has already disappeared from the historical record. They had at least one daughter, who married Narjot de Toucy.

Her date of death is sometimes given in modern genealogies as "1220" or "after 1240".

Cultural references 
The crusader Robert of Clari, writing only 25 years after the event, is clear about the rich entourage that accompanied Agnes to Constantinople:

then the king arrayed his sister very richly and sent her with the messengers to Constantinople, and many of his people with her ... When they were come, the emperor did very great honor to the damsel and made great rejoicing over her and her people ...

In that account the embassy is attributed to Agnes' brother, Philip II of France, but in fact it was sent by her father, Louis VII.

Agnes is the subject of the historical novel Agnes of France (1980) by Greek writer Kostas Kyriazis (b. 1920). The novel describes the events of the reigns of Manuel, Alexios and Andronikos through her eyes. She is also part of the cast of the sequels Fourth Crusade (1981) and Henry of Hainaut (1984). All three have been in print in Greece since their first edition.

Notes

Sources
 Nicetas Choniates, Historia, ed. J.-L. Van Dieten, 2 vols. (Berlin and New York, 1975); trans. as O City of Byzantium, Annals of Niketas Choniates, by H.J. Magoulias (Detroit; Wayne State University Press, 1984). Eustathios of Thessaloniki, a Disembarkation Speech for Agnes-Anna (ed. P. Wirth, Eustathii Thessalonicensis Opera Minora pp. 250–60 and translated with commentary by Andrew F. Stone, Eustathios of Thessaloniki, Secular Orations, pp. 147–65, Eustathios, The Capture of Thessaloniki ed. John R. Melville-Jones, pp. 53 and 188 and Lynda Garland Byzantine empresses: women and power in Byzantium, AD 527-1204. London, Routledge, 1999.

Bibliography
 
 Cartellieri, Alexander. Philipp II. August, König von Frankreich. Vols 1–2. Leipzig: Dyksche Buchhandlung, 1899–1906.
 Hilsdale, Cecily J. "Constructing a Byzantine Augusta: A Greek Book for a French Bride" in Art Bulletin vol. 87 (2005) pp. 458–483 Paywall
 Magdalino, Paul. The Empire of Manuel I Komnenos. 2002.

1171 births
1220 deaths
French princesses
Komnenos dynasty
House of Capet
Remarried royal consorts
12th-century Byzantine empresses
13th-century Byzantine women
12th-century French women
12th-century French people
13th-century French women
Daughters of kings